Pedesta is an Indomalayan genus of grass skippers, butterflies in the subfamily Hesperiinae (Hesperiidae).

Species
Pedesta baileyi – China (Northwest Yunnan, West Sichuan)
Pedesta blanchardii – China (Shaanxi)
Pedesta masuriensis – Himalayas to Assam, Laos, Vietnam, North Yunnan
Pedesta nanka – China (Northwest Yunnan, West Sichuan)
Pedesta panda – China
Pedesta pandita – Sikkim to Burma, North Vietnam
Pedesta pedla
Pedesta serena – China (West Sichuan, Northwest Yunnan), Northeast Burma, North Vietnam
Pedesta shensia – China (Shaanxi)
Pedesta tali – China (North Yunnan)
Pedesta naumanni – Tibet

References
Natural History Museum Lepidoptera genus database

Hesperiinae
Hesperiidae genera
Taxa named by Francis Hemming